Typhoon Krovanh, known in the Philippines as Typhoon Niña, was a moderate tropical cyclone that caused a swath of damage stretching from the Philippines to Vietnam in August 2003. The fifteenth named storm and sixth typhoon in the western Pacific that year, Krovanh originated from a tropical disturbance within the monsoon trough on August 13. Despite rather favorable conditions, the initial tropical depression did not intensify significantly and degenerated into a remnant low on August 18. However, these remnants were able to reorganize and the system was reclassified as a tropical cyclone a day later. Intensification was rather rapid upon the storm's reformation – the depression reached tropical storm status on August 20 and then typhoon intensity two days later. The typhoon emerged into the South China Sea as a much weaker tropical storm, though it was able to restrengthen over warm waters. Once again at typhoon intensity, Krovanh clipped Haiyan before moving over the Leizhou Peninsula on its way to a final landfall near Cẩm Phả, Vietnam on August 25. Quick weakening due to land interaction occurred as Krovanh moved across northern Vietnam, where the storm met its demise the following day.

Krovanh first struck the Philippines, resulting in heavy rainfall and displacing approximately 1,000 families. The flooding caused severe damage and killed one person. In Hong Kong, eleven people were injured and isolated flooding occurred as a result of the typhoon's outer rainbands. However, Krovanh's effects were much more severe in China. Guangdong, Hainan, and Guangxi were the Chinese regions most extensively impacted. The typhoon brought record wind gusts into Guangxi. In those three regions combined, 13,000 homes were estimated to have collapsed and a large swath of farmland was damaged. Two people were killed in China and economic losses approximated at RMB¥2.1 billion (US$253 million). Due to its positioning and track, of all areas in Vietnam only the country's more northern regions were impacted by Krovanh. Flash flooding occurred in those regions, and 1,000 homes were flattened. One person was killed and five others were injured in Vietnam. Overall, the typhoon was responsible for the deaths of four persons.

Meteorological history

The origin of Typhoon Krovanh can be traced back to an area of persistent convection well east of Chuuk State on August 13. Over the course of the day the disturbance gradually consolidated within favorable atmospheric conditions, and at 1800 UTC that day the Japan Meteorological Agency (JMA) assessed the system to have organized sufficiently to be classified as a tropical depression. Shower activity was suppressed by a nearby upper-level low for much of the storm's early existence; however, at 0600 UTC on August 15, the system was classified by the Joint Typhoon Warning Center (JTWC) as a tropical depression. The depression tracked northwestward under the influence of a nearby ridge. Strengthening and development of the tropical cyclone was very minimal over the next few days, and on August 18, both tracking agencies discontinued monitoring the system due to the lack of an identifiable low-level circulation center.

Redevelopment of the disturbance was a possibility following its degeneration, and on August 19, convection once again increased, prompting the JTWC to resume monitoring the system as a tropical depression at 0900 UTC, with the JMA following suit nine hours later. Due to slight wind shear, the depression's circulation center remained slightly displaced from the stronger convection. At 0600 UTC on August 20, the JTWC determined that the disturbance had intensified to reach tropical storm status. Upon the 1200 UTC upgrade to such an intensity by the JMA, the tropical cyclone was assigned the name Krovanh. Subsequently, following reclassification, Krovanh began to quickly intensify as it tracked in a somewhat southwest bearing. By August 21, the tropical storm had begun to develop a banding eye feature. At 0600 UTC that day, the JMA upgraded Krovanh to severe tropical storm intensity, whilst the JTWC indicated that the storm intensified into a typhoon.

Land interaction during Krovanh's passage of Luzon significantly weakened the cyclone, and upon the system's reemergence into the South China Sea by 2000 UTC on August 22, Krovanh was classified as only a tropical storm by the JMA. Redevelopment was rather rapid following emergence, and just four hours later the storm was redesignated as a severe tropical storm. On August 24, the storm began to develop tight banding and reformed its prior banding eye feature, which later organized into a well defined eye. Later that day Krovanh clipped the northeastern coast of Hainan before crossing the Leizhou Peninsula on August 25. During this time, the JMA upgraded Krovanh back to typhoon intensity and indicated that the storm was reaching a secondary peak in strength. The JTWC indicated a similar development as the typhoon traversed the Gulf of Tonkin. However, according to the JMA, Krovanh waned into a severe tropical storm shortly before the storm made its final landfall on Cẩm Phả, Vietnam at approximately 1500 UTC on August 25. Over land, Krovanh deteriorated rapidly, and both agencies ceased monitoring the system on August 26 while it was well northwest of Hanoi.

Preparations and impact

Philippines
Striking Luzon in the Philippines on August 22, Krovanh brought heavy precipitation. The flooding rains displaced 1000 families on the archipelago and killed a girl. Although full damage reports were never released, damages were estimated at ₱ 4.3 million (US$73,000) and of "severe extent".

Taiwan

As Krovanh was approaching the Philippines, Taiwan's Central Weather Bureau cautioned the residents of the island against strong winds and warning ships in the Bashi Channel.

China mainland
After the typhoon entered the South China Sea, sea warnings were issued for areas offshore Hainan. Additional warnings were issued and expanded as Krovanh moved closer to the Chinese coast. In preparation for the storm, shipping routes across the Qiongzhou Strait were suspended, while security measures for river dykes and reservoirs were strengthened in both Hainan and Guangdong. In Guangzhou, 15 flights were cancelled in anticipation of Krovanh, stranding 500 passengers.

Guangdong and Hainan provinces, as well as Guangxi, were the regions of China most heavily impacted by Krovanh. In Zhanjiang, Guangdong, two people were killed. Economic losses from western Guangdong alone amounted to ¥1.2 billion (US$144 million). Roughly 1,700 homes collapsed and 16 reservoirs were contaminated and destroyed. Widespread power outages occurred, impacting several neighborhoods. Strong winds also toppled coconut palms. Direct economic losses in the province totaled ¥683 million (US$82 million). Beihai City was the city most severely affected in Guangxi. Beginning on August 25, the entire population of Beihai temporarily suffered a water shortage. In the city alone, losses reached ¥988 million (US$119 million). The total economic loss was in excess of ¥2.1 billion (US$253 million).

Hong Kong
In Hong Kong, the Hong Kong Observatory issued a Standby Signal No. 1 on August 23, which was upgraded to a Strong Wind Signal No. 3 at around noon the following day. All warning signals in Hong Kong were discontinued on August 25.

Krovanh's outer rainbands brought squally weather to the territory, coupled with strong winds. Other rainfall totals of at least  were measured over a majority of the country. The strong winds and gusts uprooted trees and caused scaffolding at an estate to collapse. In the province, 11 people were injured due to effects from Krovanh. A ferry service and four bus routes were temporarily suspended following the storm.

Vietnam
Typhoon Krovanh was the strongest tropical cyclone to affect Vietnam in 2003. One person was killed in Móng Cái after their house collapsed. Hundreds of other homes were unroofed and traffic was halted. Trees were also uprooted and power outages resulted from strong winds, particularly in Quảng Ninh Province. Heavy rains triggered flash flooding in northern Vietnam. Five additional persons were injured by flying debris. About 1,000 homes in Vietnam were flattened by the storm.

See also

Typhoon Koryn (1993) – Strong tropical cyclone that struck Luzon before impacting the Guangdong region of China
Tropical Storm Nock-ten (2011) – Caused widespread damage in Luzon and Hainan
Typhoon Joe (1980) – Resulted in heavy damage in Vietnam after striking Hainan and Luzon
Tropical Storm Ma-on (2022) – similar track in the same time in 2022

Notes

References

External links

JMA General Information of Typhoon Krovanh (0312) from Digital Typhoon
JMA Best Track Data of Typhoon Krovanh (0312) 
JMA Best Track Data (Graphics) of Typhoon Krovanh (0312)
JMA Best Track Data (Text)
JTWC Best Track Data of Typhoon 12W (Krovanh)
12W.KROVANH from the U.S. Naval Research Laboratory

2003 Pacific typhoon season
Typhoons in the Philippines
Typhoons in China
Typhoons in Vietnam
Typhoons
Krovanh